Appley may refer to the following places in the United Kingdom:

 Appley, a hamlet in the civil parish of Stawley in Somerset
 Appley, Isle of Wight, an area of Ryde
 Appley Bridge, a village in West Lancashire, England
 Appley House, Isle of Wight
 Appley Towers, Isle of Wight

See also
 Apley (disambiguation)